The Maritime Alps are a mountain range in the southwestern part of the Alps. They form the border between the French region of Provence-Alpes-Côte d'Azur and the Italian regions of Piedmont and Liguria. They are the southernmost part of the Alps.

Geography 
Administratively the range is divided between the Italian provinces of Cuneo and Imperia (eastern slopes) and the French department of Alpes-Maritimes (western slopes).

The Maritime Alps are drained by the rivers Roya, Var and Verdon and their tributaries on the French side; by the Stura di Demonte and other tributaries of the Tanaro and Po on the Italian side. There are many attractive perched villages, such as Belvédère at the entrance to the spectacular Gordolasque valley, some concealing unexpected architectural riches (for example in the south there are numerous churches decorated with murals and altarpieces by primitive Niçois painters).

Borders 
The borders of the Maritime Alps are (anticlockwise):
 Vermenagna creek, Col de Tende - which connects them with the Ligurian Alps - and Roya (east);
 Mediterranean Sea and Var valley (south)
 Verdon, Col d'Allos - which connects them with Provence Alps and Prealps - and Ubaye (west);
 Maddalena Pass (which connects them with the Cottian Alps) and Stura di Demonte (north).

Peaks
The main peaks of the Maritime Alps are:

Mountain passes

The chief passes of the Maritime Alps are:

Nature conservation 

The French Mercantour National Park (central area:68,500 ha + peripheral area:140,000 ha) is part of the Maritime Alps as well as the Parco naturale delle Alpi Marittime, an Italian regional nature park of 28,455 ha.

References

Maps
 Italian official cartography (Istituto Geografico Militare - IGM); on-line version: www.pcn.minambiente.it
 French  official cartography (Institut Géographique National - IGN); on-line version:  www.geoportail.fr

 
Mountain ranges of the Alps
Mountain ranges of Piedmont
Mountains of Alpes-Maritimes
Mountain ranges of Liguria

es:Alpes Marítimos y prealpes de Niza
it:Alpi Marittime e Prealpi di Nizza